DLife (stylized as dLife) is a half-hour-long American weekly lifestyle television series broadcasting Sundays at 7 PM ET on CNBC. The show, which started airing in 2005, is the first television program dedicated entirely to people living with diabetes and the people who care for them. As of 2013, dLife TV is available online only and no longer appears on CNBC.

Show format
dLife is anchored by Benno C. Schmidt III, a veteran network and local broadcast journalist and anchor,  along with co-host Jim Turner, who both live with diabetes. Looking at diabetes as a lifestyle rather than a disease, dLife features a wide variety of segments which inspire and connect the diabetes community.

Regular segments include the dLife Kitchen, featuring a diabetes-friendly recipe with chef Michel Nischan, and Real People Real Stories, where viewers send in their personal stories about dealing with diabetes. In addition, there are segments discussing advancements in diabetes research, fitness and health and new diabetes products and therapies on the market. dLife also regularly has special guests, many of whom are celebrities in sports, politics or entertainment, who come on the show and discuss how they deal with diabetes.

Celebrity appearances
Among the guests who have appeared are:

Dmitri Young, Major League Baseball player
Chris Matthews, host of Hardball with Chris Matthews
Nick Jonas, lead singer/guitarist for the Jonas Brothers
Jerry Mathers, actor (Leave it to Beaver)
Delta Burke, actress (Designing Women), Miss Florida, Miss USA
Jerry Stackhouse, NBA player, Dallas Mavericks
Bill Brown, basketball coach
Darren Brass, tattoo artist, star of Miami Ink
Will Cross, mountain climber
Mike Huckabee, Arkansas governor
Gary Hall, Jr., Olympic swimmer
Aida Turturro, actress (The Sopranos)
Dorian Gregory, actor (Baywatch Nights, The Other Half, Charmed)
Patti LaBelle, soul singer
Don Francisco, host of Sábado Gigante
Damon Dash, entrepreneur, co-founder of Roc-a-Fella Records
Jason Johnson, Major League Baseball player
Bret Michaels, singer, Poison
Elaine Stritch, comedian, actress
Ron Santo, former Major League Baseball player
Phife Dawg, rapper, A Tribe Called Quest
Joe Frazier, boxer
B.B. King, blues musician
Kevin Covais, American Idol contestant

References

External links
 Official site
 dLifeTV.com! Online Episodes and Clips
 dLife - YouTube Official channel

Diabetes
2005 American television series debuts
2000s American television talk shows
CNBC original programming
Health information television series
Television shows about diseases and disorders
2010s American television talk shows